Marlene Stewart Streit,  (born March 9, 1934) is a Canadian amateur golfer, and a member of the World Golf Hall of Fame.

She was born in Cereal, Alberta. She learned golf from Gordon McInnis Sr. at the Lookout Point Golf Club in Fonthill, Ontario. She is the most successful Canadian amateur female golfer, and the only golfer in history to have won the Australian, British, Canadian and U.S. Women's Amateurs. She graduated from Rollins College in 1956 and won the national individual intercollegiate golf championship that same year.

Streit was a member of the Canadian team at the Espirito Santo Trophy in 1966, 1970, 1972, and 1984. She owns a home in Wellington, Florida. She won the Bobbie Rosenfeld Award for best Canadian female athlete for the fifth time in 1963.

Significant career wins
 Ontario Junior Girls (2-time winner)
 Ontario Ladies' Amateur – 1951, 1956, 1957, 1958, 1968, 1969, 1970, 1972, 1974, 1976, 1977
 Ontario Senior Ladies' Amateur (6 times)
 Canadian Women's Amateur – 1951, 1954, 1955, 1956, 1958, 1959, 1963, 1968, 1969, 1972, 1973
 CLGA Close Amateurs – 1951, 1952, 1953, 1954, 1955, 1956, 1957, 1963, 1968
 CLGA Senior Women's Amateur – 1985, 1987, 1988, 1993
 U.S. Women's Intercollegiate Championship – 1956
 British Ladies Amateur – 1953
 U.S. Women's Amateur – 1956
 Australian Women's Amateur – 1963
 North and South Women's Amateur – 1956, 1974
 U.S. Senior Women's Amateur – 1985, 1994, 2003

Honours
 In 1951 and 1956, she was awarded the Lou Marsh Trophy.
 In 1952, 1953, 1956, 1957, and 1963, she won the Bobbie Rosenfeld Award.
 In 1962, she was inducted into Canada's Sports Hall of Fame.
 In 1967, she was made an Officer of the Order of Canada.
 In 1971, she was inducted into the Canadian Golf Hall of Fame.
 In 1995, she was inducted into the Ontario Sports Hall of Fame in 1995.
 In 2000, she was inducted into the Ontario Golf Hall of Fame.
 In 2004, she was the first Canadian inducted into the World Golf Hall of Fame.
 In 2006, she was made a member of the Order of Ontario.

Team appearances
Amateur
Espirito Santo Trophy (representing Canada): 1966, 1970, 1972, 1984

References

External links
Histori.ca profile

Canadian Golf Hall of Fame profile
Canada's Sports Hall of Fame profile

Canadian female golfers
Amateur golfers
Rollins Tars women's golfers
Winners of ladies' major amateur golf championships
World Golf Hall of Fame inductees
Golfing people from Alberta
Golfing people from Ontario
Lou Marsh Trophy winners
Members of the Order of Ontario
Officers of the Order of Canada
1934 births
Living people